Bavlin (also Romanized as Bāvlīn; also known as Emamzadegan Ahmed va Mahmud (Persian: امامزادگان احمد و محمود), also Romanized as Emāmzādegān Āḥmed va Maḥmūd) is a village in Kakavand-e Gharbi Rural District, Kakavand District, Delfan County, Lorestan Province, Iran. At the 2006 census, its population was 18, in 4 families.

References 

Towns and villages in Delfan County